Maireana excavata, the bottle bluebush, is a species of flowering plant in the family Amaranthaceae, native to southeastern Australia. A decumbent perennial with a substantial taproot, it is typically found growing in heavy soils.

References

excavata
Endemic flora of Australia
Flora of South Australia
Flora of New South Wales
Flora of Victoria (Australia)
Plants described in 1975